Hong Kong people of Fujianese origin. Also known as Hoklo (although this term in many contexts also encompasses Chiu Chow people). North Point has a prominent Fujianese community. During the Hong Kong protests there were rumors of armed gangs from the mainland coming to settle disputes with protesters.

The Hoklo people are among the Indigenous inhabitants of the New Territories.

It is thought that 800,000 people have their origin in Fujian.

http://www.lcsd.gov.hk/CE/CulturalService/HKFA/en_US/web/hkfa/publications_souvenirs/pub/topicalvolumes_tc/topicalvolumes_tc_detail15.html

People
 Ruco Chan 
 Yoyo Chen 
 Choy So-yuk
 Theresa Fu
 Raymond Lam
 Ma Lik
 John Ng
 Ng Man-tat 
 Raymond Or
 Simon Peh
 Andrew Tan 
 Wong Ker-lee
 Philip Wong
 Wong Po-yan

See also
 Fujianese organized crime
 Fukien Secondary School
 :zh:閩光書院 (Amoy College)
 Chiyu Banking Corporation

References

Bibliography
 Gregory Elliott Guldin, "Overseas" at Home: The Fujianese of Hong Kong, Volume 1, University of Wisconsin, 1977

People from Fujian
Fukien